The Battle of Dolores River was a battle fought during the Philippine–American War.

Background
The Pulahanes in July 1904 slaughtered the people of Taviran and then burned the town of Santa Elena. In December, over a thousand Pulahanes besieged a detachment of native scouts in the town of Taft.

Battle
In December 1904, the 38th Philippine Constabulary Scouts, under Lieutenant Stephen Hayt, were on patrol along the Dolores River in an attempt to link up with the 37th Constabulary Scouts and another Constable Company led by Lieutenant Hendryx.

The 38th was ambushed en route, by over 1,000 Pulahanes. As the Pulahanes rushed, waving colorful banners and shouting "Tad-Tad!" (Cut To Pieces!) they were met with a volley of rifle-fire that stopped their advance. The Constables held their ground and repelled the attacks, inflicting heavy losses with accurate and steady rifle fire.

The Pulahanes were far greater in number, however, and they eventually enveloped and wiped out the entire scout force.

Aftermath
Of the 43-man contingent, the officer and 37 of his men were killed. The Pulajans on the other hand, suffered much heavier losses. Estimates range as high as 300 dead before the Constabulary fell.

The Pulajan fighters were able to capture 38 Krags rifles, along with a large amount of ammunition.

References

Visayan history
Doloras, Massacre at
Doloras, Massacre at
Dolores River
1904 in the Philippines
Dolores River
December 1904 events